The Prix Luc-Perreault, formerly known as the Prix L.-E.-Ouimet-Molson, is an annual Canadian film award, presented by the Association québécoise des critiques de cinéma to a film deemed to be the best film of the year from Quebec, from among the films screening at that year's Rendez-vous Québec Cinéma.

Winners

1970s
 1974 — Orders (Les Ordres), Michel Brault
 1975 — Ntesi nana shepen (On disait que c'était notre terre), Arthur Lamothe
 1976 — Little Tougas (Ti-Cul Tougas), Jean-Guy Noël
 1977 — 24 heures ou plus, Gilles Groulx
 1978 — The Backstreet Six (Comme les six doigts de la main), André Melançon
 1979 — Blue Winter (L'Hiver bleu), André Blanchard

1980s
 1980 — A Wives' Tale (Une histoire de femmes), Sophie Bissonnette, Martin Duckworth and Joyce Rock
 1981 — The Plouffe Family (Les Plouffe), Gilles Carle
 1982 — Comfort and Indifference (Le Confort et l'indifférence), Denys Arcand
 1983 — The Ballad of Hard Times (La Turlute des années dures), Richard Boutet and Pascal Gélinas
 1984 — A Woman in Transit (La Femme de l'hôtel), Léa Pool
 1985 — Caffè Italia, Montréal, Paul Tana
 1986 — The Decline of the American Empire (Le Déclin de l'empire américain), Denys Arcand
 1987 — Train of Dreams, John N. Smith
 1988 — Kalamazoo, André Forcier
 1989 — Lessons on Life (Trois pommes à côté du sommeil), Jacques Leduc

1990s
 1990 — The Moving Statue (La Liberté d'une statue), Olivier Asselin
 1991 — The Company of Strangers, Cynthia Scott
 1992 — Requiem for a Handsome Bastard (Requiem pour un beau sans-cœur), Robert Morin
 1993 — Two Can Play (Deux actrices), Micheline Lanctôt
 1994 — Octobre, Pierre Falardeau
 1995 — Rural Route 5 (Rang 5), Richard Lavoie
 1996 — The Human Plant (La Plante humaine), Pierre Hébert
 1997 — Tu as crié: Let me go, Anne-Claire Poirier
 1998 — Whoever Dies, Dies in Pain (Quiconque meurt, meurt à douleur), Robert Morin
 1999 — Post Mortem, Louis Bélanger

2000s
 2000 — The Left-Hand Side of the Fridge (La Moitié gauche du frigo), Philippe Falardeau
 2001 — Marriages (Mariages), Catherine Martin
 2002 — Yellowknife, Rodrigue Jean
 2003 — Gaz Bar Blues, Louis Bélanger
 2004 — What Remains of Us (Ce qu'il reste de nous), François Prévost and Hugo Latulippe
 2005 — The Novena (La Neuvaine), Bernard Émond
 2006 — Congorama, Philippe Falardeau
 2007 — Continental, a Film Without Guns (Continental, un film sans fusil), Stéphane Lafleur
 2008 — The Necessities of Life (Ce qu'il faut pour vivre), Benoît Pilon
 2009 — The Legacy (La Donation), Bernard Émond

2010s
 2010 — Curling, Denis Côté
 2011 — The Salesman (Le Vendeur), Sébastien Pilote
 2012 — War Witch (Rebelle), Kim Nguyen
 2013 — The Meteor (Le Météore), François Delisle
 2014 — Mommy, Xavier Dolan
 2015 — The Demons (Les Démons), Philippe Lesage
 2016 — Before the Streets (Avant les rues), Chloé Leriche
 2017 — Ravenous (Les Affamés), Robin Aubert
 2018 — The Devil's Share (La Part du diable), Luc Bourdon
 2019 — The Twentieth Century, Matthew Rankin

2020s
 2020 — Nadia, Butterfly, Pascal Plante
 2021 — Archipelago (Archipel), Félix Dufour-Laperrière

References

Quebec film awards